is an historical gate (mon) located in the Taitō ward of Tokyo, Japan.

One of two remaining gates of the Edo period daimyō mansions in the city (the other one is Akamon, currently located in the University of Tokyo).

The exact date in which it was first constructed is not known, but the consensus is that it dates from the late Edo period, probably from the late 18th century or early 19th century.

It is currently located in the grounds of the Tokyo National Museum, and it has been designated an Important Cultural Property.

History 

The Kuromon was first built as the main gate of the Edo mansion of the branch of the Ikeda clan from the Tottori Domain, which included the Inaba Province and Hōki Province in the modern-day Tottori Prefecture.

In 1892 the gate was moved to Meiji-era Tōgū Palace in Akasaka, Tokyo, and some time later to the residence of Prince Takamatsu (1905–1987), the third son of Emperor Taishō.

It was designated an Important Cultural Property in September 1951.

Finally in March 1954 it was moved to its final location in the Tokyo National Museum and rebuilt there.

Architecture 

The gate, made in dark wood, has a large hipped-gable roof construction, with smaller Karahafu roofs on the sides, covering the guards' chambers.

Access 

Kuromon is located in the grounds of the Tokyo National Museum, but it can be seen from the outside with no admission fee.

The gate can also be seen more closely from inside the museum, by purchasing an entrance ticket.

On Saturdays, Sundays and holidays, between 10 am and 4 pm, the gate is opened and can be walked through.

References

External links 

Accessibility website at the Tokyo National Museum

Gates in Japan
Buildings and structures in Taitō
Ueno Park
Important Cultural Properties of Japan